The Royal Bermuda Yacht Club (RBYC) is a private yacht club that was established as the Bermuda Yacht Club on 1 November, 1844,  after the sport of racing yachts had become established in Bermuda primarily as a pastime of idle officers of the Bermuda Garrison and the Royal Naval Dockyard, Bermuda.<ref>{{cite news |last=Smalls |first=H. B. |date=1912-09-24 |title=IN THE LONG AGO |work=The Royal Gazette |location=City of Hamilton, Pembroke Parish, Bermuda |quote=Mr. H. B. Small's letter to-day, gives an account of the first recorded Yacht race in Bermuda, some 150 years ago which is particularly interesting as recalling the sporting tendencies of the past.AN OLD YACHT RACETo The Editor of The Royal Gazette: Sir,—The recent Boat race here recalled to my mind that I had amongst my records, or Archives as I call them an account of the first yacht race held in Bermuda in the year of our Lord 1784, which is full of interest as affording an insight into life here in those "good old days of yore." Amongst the Garrison officers stationed at that time at St. George's, were a Captain Remington and a Captain Brown, both "wealthy and much addicted to sport. The former urged a Mr. J. Trott to "sail a race," and Captain Brown urged a Mr. W. Sears to accept the challenge,}}</ref> In 1845, Prince Albert consented to become Patron of the Club and in 1846 the club was permitted to add the adjective "Royal" to its name. The RBYC flies the blue ensign with the RBYC badge.

In 1933 the club moved to its current site at Albuoy's Point, Hamilton. Currently the club has about 850 resident and non-resident members.

The club is also the third oldest 'Royal' club outside the British Isles. 

The club has co-hosted the biannual Bermuda Race from 1906 to 1926 with various American yacht clubs, and since 1926 with the Cruising Club of America. It also currently hosts the Charleston Bermuda Race.

Cocktail
The RBYC gave name to the Royal Bermuda (Yacht Club) Cocktail'', - a mixed drink that contains Barbados rum, fresh lime juice, Cointreau, sugar or falernum.

See also
Royal Hamilton Amateur Dinghy Club
Sport in Bermuda

References

External links
 
 RBYC ensign

Royal yacht clubs
Yacht clubs in Bermuda
Bermuda Yacht Club, Royal
1844 establishments in Bermuda
Sports clubs established in 1844
Hamilton, Bermuda